Thein Tun (26 March 1937 – 18 April 2022) was a Burmese businessman and founder of Myanmar Golden Star. He was best known for introducing Pepsi into the Burmese market through Myanmar Golden Star in 1991. He benefited from close connections with Tun Kyi, a former Burmese general. Thein Tun also founded Tun Foundation Bank. In 2014, he acquired majority stake in Myanmar Consolidated Media, which owns Myanmar Times.

Thein Tun was married to Nelly Than. He had 2 sons and one daughter. His son, Thant Zin Tun, is president of Mandalay Novotel Hotel and LP Holding Group, while another son, Oo Tun, is managing director of MGS Beverages. His only daughter, Mi Mi Tun, is an executive director at MGS Beverages. Thein Tun's son-in-law, Aung Moe Kyaw, owns International Beverages Trading.

References

1937 births
2022 deaths
20th-century Burmese businesspeople
People from Ayeyarwady Region